Miroslav Petrov (Bulgarian: Мирослав Петров; born 7 June 1981) is a Bulgarian professional footballer who  plays for Velbazhd Kyustendil as a striker.

References

External links

1981 births
Living people
Bulgarian footballers
PFC Spartak Pleven players
PFC Spartak Varna players
FC Montana players
OFC Vihren Sandanski players
PFC Minyor Pernik players
PFC Velbazhd Kyustendil players
First Professional Football League (Bulgaria) players

Association football forwards